The Symphony No. 9 in C major,  944, known as The Great, is the final symphony completed by Franz Schubert. It was first published by Breitkopf & Härtel in 1849 as "Symphonie / C Dur / für großes Orchester" and listed as Symphony No. 8 in the New Schubert Edition. Originally called The Great C major to distinguish it from his Symphony No. 6, the Little C major, the subtitle is now usually taken as a reference to the symphony's majesty. Unusually long for a symphony of its time, a typical performance of The Great lasts an hour when all repeats indicated in the score are taken. The symphony was not professionally performed until a decade after Schubert's death.

Composition and early reception

For a long time, the symphony was believed to be a work of Schubert's last year, 1828. It was true that, in the last months of his life, he did start drafting a symphony – but this was the work in D major now accepted as Symphony No. 10, which has been realized for performance by Brian Newbould. Now it is known that the 'Great' was largely composed in sketch in the summer of 1825: that, indeed it was the work to which Schubert was referring in a letter of March 1824 when he said he was preparing himself to write 'a grand symphony' (originally listed as Gmunden-Gastein symphony, D 849, in the Deutsch Catalogue). By the spring or summer of 1826 it was completely scored, and in October, Schubert, who was quite unable to pay for a performance, sent it to the Gesellschaft der Musikfreunde with a dedication. In response they made him a small payment, arranged for the copying of the orchestral parts, and at some point in the latter half of 1827 gave the work an unofficial perfunctory play-through (the exact date and the conductor are unknown) – though it was set aside as too long and difficult for the amateur orchestra of the conservatory.

The evidence for this hypothesis is slender, however, and it contradicts contemporary sources which prove that Schubert's Symphony No. 6 (also in C major) was performed at this instance. In 1836 Schubert's brother Ferdinand attempted to perform the final movement alone, yet there is no evidence that a public performance ever took place.

In 1838, ten years after Schubert's death, Robert Schumann visited Vienna and was shown the manuscript of the symphony at the Gesellschaft der Musikfreunde by Ferdinand Schubert. He took a copy that Ferdinand had given him back to Leipzig, where the entire work was performed publicly for the first time by Felix Mendelssohn at the Leipzig Gewandhaus on 21 March 1839. Schumann celebrated the event in the Neue Zeitschrift für Musik with an ecstatic article in which, in a phrase destined to become famous, he hailed the symphony for its 'heavenly length'.

The symphony, however, was found to be very difficult for orchestras of the day because of its extremely lengthy woodwind and string parts. When Mendelssohn took the symphony to Paris in 1842 and London in 1844, orchestras flatly refused to play it; in London, the violinists are reputed to have collapsed in laughter when rehearsing the second subject of the finale.

Numbering 

There continues to be long-standing controversy regarding the numbering of this symphony, with some scholars (usually German-speaking) numbering it as Symphony No. 7. The most recent version of the Deutsch catalogue (the standard catalogue of Schubert's works, compiled by Otto Erich Deutsch) lists it as No. 8, while most English-speaking scholars list it as No. 9.

Form

Following the standard symphonic form, there are four movements:

I. Andante – Allegro ma non troppo – Più moto
The first movement begins with an extensive introduction with its own miniaturised exposition, development and recapitulation. The opening theme is used in a modified form as secondary subject matter in the main section of the movement. The rest of the movement is in sonata form with two periods for each theme and several transition themes and extra material. The opening theme of the introduction is restated in the coda (b. 570) before the final cadences.

II. Andante con moto
The second movement is in a modified sonata form without a development section characterised as P1 S1 P2 S2 (or A–B–A–B).

III. Scherzo. Allegro vivace; Trio
The third movement is a lengthy Scherzo and Trio which is structured in sonata form.

IV. Finale. Allegro vivace
The finale is in an extended sonata form. There are no less than six unique thematic elements in the main themes alone. The development section focuses on the third and sixth thematic elements. There is an extensive use of ostinato in accompaniment of two of the thematic elements. Midway through this final movement Schubert pays tribute to Beethoven by quoting from the finale of his Ninth Symphony. The recapitulation is unusual in that it begins in E-flat, modulates to F major, and then to the tonic (rather than everything being in the tonic as expected).

Music

Often considered Schubert's finest piece for orchestra, this symphony is also one of the composer's most innovative pieces. Thematic development in the style of Beethoven is still present in the work, but Schubert puts far more emphasis on melody. The new style prompted Robert Schumann to pursue his own symphonic ambitions.

Instrumentation
The symphony is scored for 2 flutes, 2 oboes, 2 clarinets in A and C, 2 bassoons, 2 horns in C, 2 trumpets in A and C, 3 trombones, timpani, and strings.

Beethoven had always used the trombone as an effect, and therefore very sparingly, or, in the case of his Ninth Symphony, also to double the alto, tenor, and bass parts of the chorus as was common in sacred music and opera at the time. However, in Schubert's Unfinished Symphony and the Ninth Symphony, the trombones become essential members of the orchestra playing throughout the piece, and even receive important melodic roles.

See also
Schubert symphonies

Notes

References
 Brian Newbould, Schubert and the Symphony. A New Perspective (London, 1992)

External links
 
 

No. 9
1826 compositions
Compositions by Franz Schubert published posthumously
Compositions in C major